Kevan Smith may refer to:
Kevan Smith (footballer) (born 1959), English former footballer
Kevan Smith (baseball) (born 1988), American professional baseball catcher

See also
Evan Smith (disambiguation)
Kavan Smith (born 1970), Canadian actor
Kevin Smith (disambiguation)